Alf Hagon (born 3 October 1931 in Ilford, England) is a former motorcycle speedway rider who later competed in Grasstrack. He manufactured off-road competition frames, forks and other components, later developing into the production of shock absorbers, specialising in modern-replicas of the traditional Girlings used as original equipment and replacements for historic motorcycles.

Competition background
Over a 12-year career in Speedway, he rode for six teams. In four consecutive years - 1961, 1962, 1963, and 1964 - he rode for teams that ended their seasons at the bottom of the table. He later found regular success when competing in Grasstrack.
 
When riding in Grasstrack, Hagon started to develop a racing machine, with the assistance of Essex motorcycle dealer and competition sponsor Tom Kirby, creating a lightweight bike powered by a JAP engine. In 1958 he established a business building speedway and grasstrack bike frames in his mother's garden shed, but progress was interrupted in 1960 when he went on tour in Australia with the national England team. He represented England on four occasions.

On his return, the business transferred to Leyton, East London. This proved successful with his bikes in good demand and he retired from racing in 1965 to concentrate on the business.

However, Hagon had become involved in 
sprinting, appearing at the first International Dragfest in 1964, on his lightweight JAP-engined bike.

For the 1964 Dragfest, a competition against Americans who were using large capacity, double-engined machines – he fitted oversize pistons and cylinders to take advantage of a maximum engine-size dispensation by the ACU, raising the J.A.P. engine's capacity from 996 cc to 1,100 cc, and the power output from 84 bhp to 91 bhp, compared to a blown Vincent's 130 bhp.

In July 1967, riding a purpose-built sprint-bike powered by a supercharged V-Twin 1,260 cc JAP engine, he became the first rider to record a sub-10 second time with a one-way-only 9.93 performance at Duxford for the -mile distance. This was a strip-only record, as for official recognition of world and national records two qualifying runs have to be completed in opposite-directions within one-hour, to negate the effect of wind, with an average time resulting. In October 1967 he achieved an average time of 9.95 at Elvington, Yorkshire.

He followed that by setting a long-standing record of 9.432 at 153 mph at Santa Pod. In 1968 he became the first British rider to complete a flying mile at over 200 mph (206.54 mph) at RAF Honington.

Business developments
Hagon's base from 1960 was a former stable block in Leyton, London. Specialising in wheel-building and accident damage repairs, he purchased the former Girling suspension operation in 1985, including the stock, manufacturing  tools and drawings. He did not purchase the rights to the Girling name, instead naming his products as simply Hagon.

Personal life
Hagon, married with two children and five grandchildren, lives near Waltham Abbey in Hertfordshire.

References

Sources
 
 Bamford,R & Shailes,G (2007). “The Story of Oxford Speedway”. 
Alf Hagon. Classic British Motorcycles. 2013. Google Books. 
Alf Hagon. page 43. Drag Bike Racing in Britain: From the Mid 60s to the Mid 80s. 2010. Google Books.

1931 births
Living people
British motorcycle racers
British speedway riders
Wimbledon Dons riders
Oxford Cheetahs riders
Poole Pirates riders
West Ham Hammers riders
Harringay Racers riders
Leicester Hunters riders